"Lost in Music" is a 1979 song by American vocal group Sister Sledge, released as the third single from their third studio album, We Are Family (1979), an album entirely written, produced, and arranged by Nile Rodgers and Bernard Edwards (of the group Chic). The "intoxicating" song was a no. 35 hit on the American R and B charts.

Reception
Cash Box described "Lost in Music" as a "very Chic tune" with "sparse, elegant instrumentation and a "fascinating" hook.  Record World said that the "Clear. clean production, snappy percussion, & choir-like vocals are overwhelming."  Alan Jones from Music Week gave the 1993 remix three out of five, adding that "once again the original Chic hallmarks are ditched to turn the track into an edgy, percussive rattling slab of Nineties dance music." 

"Lost in Music" was one of the group's biggest hits. The song charted at No. 35 on the US Billboard R&B chart (then called the Hot Soul Singles chart)). It also reached the UK top twenty in three separate decades. The original version reached #17 in 1979, while a remixed version reached No. 4 in 1984.

Cover
A cover version of the song appeared on British post-punk band the Fall's 1993 album The Infotainment Scan; their "radically different" version has been read as a critique of the "unfair derision of the disco genre".

Charts

References

1979 songs
1979 singles
1993 singles
Sister Sledge songs
Song recordings produced by Bernard Edwards
Song recordings produced by Nile Rodgers
Songs written by Bernard Edwards
Songs written by Nile Rodgers